Governor Blair may refer to:

Austin Blair (1818–1894), 13th Governor of Michigan
James T. Blair Jr. (1902–1962), 44th Governor of Missouri